The following lists events that happened in 1920 in Iceland.

Incumbents
Monarch – Kristján X
Prime Minister – Jón Magnússon

Events

1920 Úrvalsdeild

Births
 
15 February – Bjarni Jónsson, mathematician and logician (d. 2016)
17 May – Jón Kristjánsson, cross country skier (d. 1996).
13 November – Sæmundur Gíslason, footballer (d. 2003)

Deaths
18 November – Matthías Jochumsson, poet, playwright and translator (b. 1835)

References

 
1920s in Iceland
Iceland
Iceland
Years of the 20th century in Iceland